Savannah Ashley Harmon (born October 27, 1995) is an American ice hockey defenceman and member of the United States women's national ice hockey team, currently affiliated with the Minnesota chapter of the Professional Women's Hockey Players Association (PWHPA).

Playing career
Harmon played her college ice hockey career with the Clarkson Golden Knights women's ice hockey program and captained Clarkson to consecutive NCAA Women's Ice Hockey Championship titles in 2017 and 2018. In 2018, she was a top-10 finalist for the Patty Kazmaier Award and was named an All-USCHO First Team All-Star.

In 2017, Harmon was drafted in the second round, 6th overall by the Buffalo Beauts. She played the 2018–19 NWHL season with the Beauts, before joining the Buffalo chapter of the PWHPA for the 2019–20 season. She relocated to Minnesota for the 2020–21 PWHPA season and participated in the organization’s Dream Gap Tour and other showcases.

International play
Harmon made her debut with the United States women's national ice hockey team in the last three games of the 2019–20 Rivalry Series, a five-game series of international friendlies played between Team USA and the Canadian national team. 

She was officially named to the US roster for the 2020 IIHF Women's World Championship before the tournament was canceled due to the COVID-19 pandemic. Undeterred, she re-earned a spot on the roster for the 2021 IIHF Women's World Championship. 

On January 2, 2022, Harmon was named to Team USA's roster to represent the United States at the 2022 Winter Olympics.

Personal life
Harmon has a degree in business innovation and entrepreneurship from Clarkson University and intends to pursue a Juris Doctor after her hockey career has ended.

References

External links

1995 births
Living people
American women's ice hockey defensemen
Buffalo Beauts players
Clarkson Golden Knights women's ice hockey players
Ice hockey players at the 2022 Winter Olympics
Medalists at the 2022 Winter Olympics
Olympic silver medalists for the United States in ice hockey
Ice hockey players from Illinois
Olympic ice hockey players of the United States
People from Downers Grove, Illinois
Professional Women's Hockey Players Association players